The following highways are numbered 695:

Canada
 Alberta Highway 695
 New Brunswick Route 695
Saskatchewan Highway 695

United States
  Interstate 695 (disambiguation)
 Connecticut State Road 695 (unsigned, part of the Connecticut Turnpike)
  New York State Route 695

Territories
  Puerto Rico Highway 695